Ina, Kapatid, Anak (International title: Her Mother's Daughter/) is a 2012 Philippine family drama television series directed by Don M. Cuaresma and Jojo A. Saguin, starring Kim Chiu and Maja Salvador, together with an ensemble cast. The series was aired on ABS-CBN and worldwide on The Filipino Channel from October 8, 2012 to June 14, 2013, replacing Lorenzo's Time and was replaced by Huwag Ka Lang Mawawala. The show is now airing in Tanzania on Star TV and Kenya on KTN in Africa.

The drama follows the lives of Celyn (Kim Chiu), Margaux (Maja Salvador), Liam (Xian Lim), and Ethan (Enchong Dee) and their struggles for power, family and love.

The show was extended due to success in viewership ratings. The second season aired on January 14, 2013 with the episode featuring the grand revelation of Celyn being the daughter of Julio and Beatriz, while the third and final season debuted on March 7, 2013 featuring a new chapter focusing on the characters' young-adult stage and business rivalry.

The show also won the award for Best Drama Series in the 2013 Yahoo OMG! awards, and was nominated in the 27th PMPC Awards as Best Primetime Drama Series of 2013.

Plot
Celyn Buenaventura (Kim Chiu) is an ambitious and kind working-class girl living in Cebu with her widowed mother, Theresa Apolinario (Cherry Pie Picache). One day, she received an acceptance letter from the University of the Philippines Diliman, but Theresa was furious and refused to let her go. Celyn thus travelled alone to Manila, and upon arriving was employed by the owner of a carinderia, who allowed her to sleep in the eatery. On the first day of school, Celyn met Margaux Marasigan (Maja Salvador), the daughter of Julio (Ariel Rivera) and Beatrice Marasigan (Janice de Belen), owners of the famous Memorata shoe company. Margaux lived the luxurious life of an heiress, and Celyn looked up to her in admiration. Celyn also met her friends, Ethan Castillo (Enchong Dee) and Liam Lagdameo (Xian Lim); she and Liam were initially irritated with each other and she remembered Ethan from a childhood incident where he seemingly saved her life. Celyn and Margaux eventually became best friends. Celyn found out that Ethan and Margaux were lovers. Margaux may have led a life like a princess, but she was often concerned about her mother's strictness. Margaux follows everything Beatrice says, but she knows that her family is against Ethan. They kept their relationship a secret. Celyn found out that Liam has a lifelong crush with Margaux, who was his best friend. They promised not to tell anyone when Liam also found out Celyn likes Ethan. Beatrice showed great dislike to Celyn because she believes Celyn is changing Margaux, while Julio defended Celyn. Theresa decided to move to Manila with her father, Zacharias (Ronaldo Valdez), and was found by Julio, who confronted her and asked where she took his real child. Theresa tried to hide Celyn from Julio, but they already met each other. Ethan's father ran away because Lucas thought that he is the one who took his money.

When Margaux and Ethan decided to elope, they were thwarted by Beatrice after Celyn informed her of the escape attempt. Margaux couldn't believe Celyn would betray her, and their feud began. Ethan tried to get Margaux back, but she denied their relationship, leaving Ethan lonely and depressed. Celyn and Ethan became closer together and Ethan confessed his feelings for Celyn. Margaux longed for Liam's company, but Liam always tried to defend Celyn whenever Margaux taunted her. Celyn was hurt at how Margaux treated her. Beatrice, who is Theresa's maternal half-sister through their mother Yolanda, found out that Julio and Theresa were meeting each other. Infuriated, she lashed out at Theresa and confrontations ensued. Julio then revealed to a shaken Celyn that she was actually their missing daughter, and Beatrice immediately regretted hating her.

Beatrice remained opposed to Theresa, and legal issues about who gets Celyn started. They agreed that Celyn will stay in Beatrice's house for the weekdays and Theresa's at the weekends. Now graduated, Celyn and Margaux's feud intensified as Margaux became more confident, determined to destroy Celyn who bested her by becoming vice-president at Memorata. Margaux thought she loves Liam and craves for his company, and Celyn forgives Ethan, after a dispute during their graduation. Celyn remained angered at Liam, and Liam confessed his feelings to Celyn. A jealous Margaux tried to win Liam back. Theresa's cousin, Oscar, has flashbacks of Theresa's pregnancy; when the midwife delivered twins, he decided to kept it a secret. The original plan was that Beatrice and Julio raise the child after its birth, but Theresa refused, saying that she carried the children and was thus their mother. After Theresa gave birth, Oscar took one child and gave it to Beatrice as promised. It was revealed that Celyn and Margaux were the babies delivered of Theresa and Beatrice, and Zacharias admits to having engineered the exchange, adding he did so to keep the peace between the two half sisters. Margaux's hatred towards Celyn became more relaxed but dangerous; she is a part of the family after all.

Mio Buenaventura (John Regala), Theresa's late husband, is revealed to have faked his death and now seeks revenge. Mio shot Julio, sending him into a coma, and while waiting on him in hospital, Celyn and Margaux reconciled and prayed for their father's recovery. Julio woke up and was discharged. Mio still continued to threaten Theresa and Beatrice’s family. Theresa eventually realized that Ethan's friend, Diego Medina (Alex Medina) - who had become close to her when she went back to university – was Joshua, her long-lost firstborn whom Mio had spirited away years before. Driven by guilt and grief, Theresa tried to get Diego back. Celyn and Ethan spied around Mio's house, trying to find evidence confirming their theory of a link between him and Diego. Mio caught them and allowed Ethan to escape while holding Celyn hostage. Mio asked for an exorbitant ransom from Lucas Elizalde, Beatrice's father, who was Mio's employer and thus the mastermind. Lucas, who wanted Mio dead lest he be implicated, agreed and sent him the money through Theresa.

In the rescue operation, policemen fired at Mio while Diego escaped, taking Celyn with him to an abandoned kitchen. Panicking, Diego randomly fired his gun, causing several LPG tanks to explode and burn the room. Margaux tried to save Celyn from the flames, but both were eventually rescued by Liam, while Mio was placed under hospital arrest. Lucas planned Mio's escape attempt because Diego had blackmailed him. After having a happy reunion, Liam proposed to Celyn, which she accepted. They all learned that Mio had escaped, and he visited Theresa again, stabbing Liam three times and before disappearing once more. Beatriz then planned to flee to Singapore for their safety, and she finally reconciled with Theresa one night, amidst hugs and tears. Margaux, Theresa, Celyn and Beatrice were then kidnapped by Mio and Diego. Lucas, who had gone to hiding with the two men after being exposed, saw Beatrice and he text Yolanda on their location. When police reinforcements came in, Mio ordered Diego to shoot his own mother, which he refused to do after a nervous breakdown. Angered, Mio tried to wrest the gun from Diego, and after a struggle pulled the trigger, shooting his son before a distraught Theresa. Diego asked her to forgive him and died, causing Mio to roil in emotional agony for killing his own son. Theresa managed to flee with the others, but Mio cornered them. He was about to shoot Theresa when Julio arrived and shot Mio. They all hugged each other while Ethan and Liam ran to meet them, but Mio stirred and shot Theresa in the back before being killed by the police.

In the hospital, Theresa came close to death, but survived the gunshot wound. The last scenes showed Celyn and Margaux over Joshua's grave, saying they forgive him, and pictures of Margaux & Ethan and Celyn & Liam, married to each other. Lucas (Eddie Gutierrez) was in prison being visited by Yolanda (Pilar Pilapil), who forgave him for what he did. Celyn and Margaux eventually became pregnant, with Liam and Ethan by their sides, and Celyn gave birth, followed by Margaux. The series ends with scenes of the entire extended family in church for the baptism of the babies, with Celyn and Margaux's babies holding hands while in their mothers' arms.

Cast and characters

Main cast 
 Kim Chiu as Celyn A. Buenaventura / Celyn E. Marasigan-Lagdameo
 Maja Salvador as Margaux E. Marasigan-Castillo
 Xian Lim as William "Liam" Lagdameo
 Enchong Dee as Ethan Castillo

 Janice de Belen as Beatrice C. Elizalde-Marasigan
 Cherry Pie Picache as Theresa C. Apolinario-Buenaventura 
 Ariel Rivera as Julio Marasigan
 Ronaldo Valdez as Zacharias "Zach" Apolinario
 Eddie Gutierrez as Lucas Elizalde
 Pilar Pilapil as Yolanda Cruz-Elizalde

Supporting cast

 John Regala as Emilio "Mio" Buenaventura
 Mickey Ferriols as Lourdes "Lulu" Castillo
 Christian Vasquez as Antonio Lagdameo, Sr.
 Jayson Gainza as Oscar Apolinario
 Francine Prieto as Martina Lagdameo
 Clarence Delgado as Ivan Lagdameo
 Alex Medina as Diego Medina / Joshua Buenaventura
 Slater Young as Antonio Lagdameo, Jr.
Mike Austria as Aurelio Castillo
 Rufami as Aliyah
 Greggy Santos as Badong

Guest cast 
 Marie Joy Dalo as Fiona Ortega / Rita Daniela 
 John Cando as Joel
 Petite as Tiny
 Andrea Brillantes as young Celyn
 Giann Marithe Solante as young Margaux
 Jerome Michael "JM" Briones as young Liam
 Ricky Castro as young Ethan
 Khaycee Aboloc as young Aliyah
 Cajo Gomez as young Diego/Joshua
 Jairus Aquino as young Oscar

Production

Concept
Ina, Kapatid, Anak is a family drama directed by Don Cuaresma and Jojo Saguin of the fantasy drama, 100 Days to Heaven and written by Danica Domingo of the critically acclaimed melodrama, Tayong Dalawa. The story conference was held on May 11, 2012 where it was officially green-lit for production. The idea of the concept came from the success of previous ABS-CBN dramas, namely Iisa Pa Lamang and Magkaribal which both focused on characters of the high society.

Casting
According to several reports made earlier by the management, the drama was supposed to be Andi Eigenmann's comeback project as an actress after her pregnancy, she was to star opposite Jessy Mendiola. During the course of pre-production, Eigenmann and Mendiola were offered separate projects by the network, Andi with Kahit Puso'y Masugatan and Mendiola with Paraiso, which they both accepted causing them to back out of the project. Meanwhile, Enchong Dee remained part of the series as Ethan, as originally planned, although the roles previously given to Martin del Rosario and Joseph Marco were offered elsewhere. After so much delay in production, ABS-CBN tapped Maja Salvador and Rayver Cruz to play the roles previously given to Mendiola and Joseph Marco, however during filming, the production crew left out Cruz's character as they felt that his character was no longer needed. Meanwhile, Kim Chiu and Xian Lim replaced Eigenmann and Del Rosario in the final casting of characters.

The series marks the reunion of Chiu and Lim as a tandem and Chiu and Salvador as rivals after the highly successful romantic comedy, My Binondo Girl which actress Cherry Pie Picache was also a part of, marking the third time Picache and Chiu worked together in one project. It is also Chiu's reunion with Dee and veteran actor Ronaldo Valdez who she once worked with in the Philippine adaptation of the South Korean drama, My Girl. Meanwhile, the drama is Dee and Salvador's first on-screen team up.

Reception

Ratings
Ina Kapatid Anak is one of the top rating shows of 2013. On February 21, 2013, the family drama posted an all-time high rating of 40.4%. Its finale episode, which aired on June 14, 2013, registered a whooping 42.9% national rating based on Kantar Media which shattered its previous all-time high ratings record.

Awards

Controversies

Cruze airbag controversy
Some viewers of the episode where Celyn and Margaux figure in a vehicular accident were surprised that the airbags of the Chevrolet Cruze used in the scene did not deploy despite the damage to the car depicted. People took their observations to Twitter, and concerned motorists inquired to Chevrolet on the car's airbag deployment mechanism. The automobile manufacturer issued a statement, reminding the public that they were watching a fictional series that did not depict a real event, and calling for such programmes to present factuality on technical matters. A regular cast member of Ina, Kapatid, Anak had to apologise over the issue on behalf of the staff, the writers and ABS-CBN.

Soundtrack

The songs used in the series was released as a soundtrack album in 2012 entitled Ina, Kapatid, Anak (Original Soundtrack). The soundtrack album was released through Star Music.

See also
List of programs broadcast by ABS-CBN
List of telenovelas of ABS-CBN

References

External links

Ina, Kapatid, Anak  on the Official ABS-CBN Forums

ABS-CBN drama series
2012 Philippine television series debuts
2013 Philippine television series endings
Television series by Dreamscape Entertainment Television
Philippine romance television series
Filipino-language television shows
Television shows filmed in the Philippines